Agenor Technology Ltd. is a privately held, consulting services company based in  Edinburgh, Scotland.

History
Agenor Technology was founded on 31 October 2006 by Andy and Jackie Smith by Andy and Jackie Smith for release and change management tooling and consulting. Agenor released their flagship product, ICEFLO, in 2008. 

The company operates in sectors including finance, healthcare, local authorities, utilities, and oil and gas.

In July 2019, Agenor Technology completed a de-merger process, formally dividing its service offering into two legally separate entities: Agenor Technology Limited and ICEFLO limited. Andy Smith remained CEO of ICEFLO Limited, with Gary Montgomery taking on the title of CEO within Agenor Technology.

Services
Agenor markets IT consulting services called programme delivery, deployment management, testing services and digital services typically for enterprises with complex software system upgrades and business objectives.

Customers
Customers include Royal Bank of Scotland, Tesco Bank, National Health Service, IBM, Micro Focus, ABN Amro and Deutsche Bank.

Awards
 Announced as placing 39th in the 15th annual Sunday Times Hiscox Tech Track 100. 
 In the Deloitte Technology Fast 50, 2015. 
 One of the 2014 Deloitte UK Fast 50 fastest growing technology companies in the UK.

Other
Agenor had £10 million turnover in 2015, the company was awarded £240,000 by Scottish Enterprise in regional selective assistance (RSA) aimed at job creation. The announcement was confirmed during a visit by Roseanna Cunningham MSP, the Scottish cabinet secretary for fair work, skills and training.

In 2015, Agenor signed the Scottish Business Pledge to build stronger businesses and a fairer Scotland, along with to date 298 other Scottish Businesses who have pledged to do the same.

Scottish Enterprise invited Founder Andy Smith to talk about how to grow businesses through innovation.

GP Bullhound identified Agenor and 11 other Scottish companies which it believed could attract a $1 billion valuation. The chief executive at trade body ScotlandIS,  named Agenor as 'one to watch' in financial technology (fintech) sector.

In 2016, Agenor Technology was named as one of the "7 most successful companies in Scotland".

In May 2016, Agenor Technology was recognised by Gartner as a Cool Vendor in DevOps, 2016 report.

References

External links
 Official website

Information technology companies of the United Kingdom
Software companies of the United Kingdom
Project management software
Companies based in Edinburgh
Software companies established in 2006
Technology companies established in 2006
2006 establishments in Scotland
Scottish brands